Kefa may refer to:
Kaffa Province, a former province of Ethiopia
Keleri-Kefa, a small village in Iran
Kefa, a word in Arabic and Aramaic that appears in the form Kefas in the Greek New Testament, and as Cephas in English translations.